The 2014 United States Senate election in Montana took place on November 4, 2014, to elect a member of the United States Senate from Montana, concurrently with other elections to the United States Senate in other states and elections to the United States House of Representatives and various state and local elections.

Democratic Senator Max Baucus, who had announced he would retire and not seek a seventh term, resigned in February 2014 in order to accept an appointment as United States Ambassador to China. Democrat John Walsh, the Lieutenant Governor of Montana, who was already running for Baucus' seat when Baucus was named to the ambassadorship, was appointed to replace Baucus by Governor Steve Bullock.

Walsh won the Democratic primary on June 3 and ran for a first full term in office, but withdrew from the race on August 7, 2014 due to allegations that he had plagiarized a term paper while attending the Army War College. Democrats selected Amanda Curtis, a state representative from Butte, to replace Walsh as the party's nominee at a convention in Helena on August 16. Steve Daines, the incumbent U.S. Representative from Montana's at-large congressional district, easily won the Republican nomination.

Daines defeated Curtis 57.9% to 40.0%, while Libertarian Roger Roots won 2.2%. Daines and Arkansas' Tom Cotton became just the 18th and 19th U.S. House freshmen to win U.S. Senate races over the last 100 years, and just the third and fourth over the last 40 years. He became the first Republican to win this Senate seat since 1913.

Democratic primary

Candidates

Declared 
 Dirk Adams, rancher, businessman and former business law professor
 John Bohlinger, former Republican Lieutenant Governor of Montana
 John Walsh, incumbent U.S. Senator, former Lieutenant Governor of Montana and former Adjutant General of the Montana National Guard

Declined 
 Max Baucus, former U.S. Senator
 Steve Bullock, Governor of Montana
 John Brueggeman, former Republican state senator
 Shane Colton, attorney and former commissioner of the Montana Department of Fish, Wildlife and Parks
 Amanda Curtis, state representative
 Melinda Gopher, writer and candidate for Montana's at-large congressional district in 2010
 Mike Halligan, executive director of the Dennis and Phyllis Washington Foundation and former state senator
 Denise Juneau, Montana Superintendent of Public Instruction
 Nancy Keenan, former president of NARAL Pro-Choice America and former Montana Superintendent of Public Instruction
 John Lewis, former state director for Senator Max Baucus (ran for the U.S. House)
 Monica Lindeen, Montana State Auditor
 Linda McCulloch, Secretary of State of Montana and former state representative
 Mike McGrath, Chief Justice of the Montana Supreme Court and former Attorney General of Montana
 John Morrison, former Montana State Auditor and candidate for the U.S. Senate in 2006
 Brian Morris, Judge of the United States District Court for the District of Montana and former associate justice of the Montana Supreme Court
 Stephanie Schriock, president of Emily's List and former chief of staff to Senator Jon Tester
 Brian Schweitzer, former Governor of Montana
 Kendall Van Dyk, state senator
 Mike Wheat, Justice of the Montana Supreme Court (ran for re-election)
 Carol Williams, former Majority Leader of the Montana Senate and nominee for Lieutenant Governor of Montana in 2000
 Pat Williams, former U.S. Representative
 Whitney Williams, former director of operations for Hillary Clinton
 Franke Wilmer, state representative
 Johnathan Windy Boy, state senator

Endorsements

Polling

Results

Democratic convention 
Because Walsh withdrew, a nominating convention was held to pick a new nominee prior to August 20.  The state party called a convention for August 16, and voting delegates were members of the State Central Committee, specifically: "one chair and one vice chair from each existing county central committee; one state committeeman and one state committeewoman from each county central committee; all voting members of the State Party Executive Board; the president of each chartered organization of the Montana Democratic Party; Montana State House leadership, and Montana State Senate leaders, and all Democrats currently holding statewide or federal office."

Candidates 
Momentary buzz was created by a movement to draft actor Jeff Bridges for the nomination, with over 1,000 people signing a petition on Change.org and a Twitter account, DudeSenator, being created online. Bridges, who lives part-time and owns property in the Paradise Valley south of Livingston, Montana, declined the offer on the Howard Stern show, noting the disapproval of his wife. Other news outlets noted that he also was not registered to vote in Montana.

Potential 
 Dirk Adams, rancher, businessman and former business law professor
 John Bohlinger, former Republican Lieutenant Governor of Montana
 Amanda Curtis, state representative
 Linda McCulloch, Secretary of State of Montana
 Anna Whiting Sorrell, former director of the state Department of Health and Human Services and former state director of the Indian Health Services

Withdrew 
 Franke Wilmer, state representative
 David Wanzenried, state senator

Declined 
 Jeff Bridges, actor and part-time Montana resident
 Steve Bullock, Governor of Montana
 Denise Juneau, Montana Superintendent of Public Instruction
 Nancy Keenan, former president of NARAL Pro-Choice America and former Montana Superintendent of Public Instruction
 Monica Lindeen, Montana State Auditor
 Stephanie Schriock, president of Emily's List and former chief of staff to Senator Jon Tester
 Brian Schweitzer, former Governor of Montana
 Carol Williams, former Majority Leader of the Montana Senate and nominee for Lieutenant Governor of Montana in 2000

Endorsements

Results

Republican primary

Candidates

Declared 
 Susan Cundiff
 Steve Daines, U.S. Representative and nominee for lieutenant governor in 2008
 Champ Edmunds, state representative

Withdrew 
 David Leaser, air traffic manager at Glacier Park International Airport
 Corey Stapleton, former state senator and candidate for governor in 2012 (running for MT-AL)

Declined 
 Chuck Baldwin, Baptist pastor, radio host, Constitution Party nominee for vice president in 2004 and for President in 2008
 John Bohlinger, former Lieutenant Governor of Montana (ran as a Democrat)
 Tim Fox, Attorney General of Montana
 Rick Hill, former U.S. Representative and nominee for governor in 2012
 Krayton Kerns, state representative
 Marc Racicot, former Governor of Montana
 Scott Reichner, state representative (ran for the state senate)
 Matthew Rosendale, state senator (ran for the U.S. House)
 Denny Rehberg, former U.S. Representative, former lieutenant governor and nominee for the U.S. Senate in 1996 and 2012
 Jon Sonju, state senator and nominee for lieutenant governor in 2012
 Larry R. Williams, author, commodity trader and nominee for the U.S. Senate in 1978 and 1982
 Ryan Zinke, former state senator and candidate for lieutenant governor in 2012 (ran for the U.S. House)

Endorsements

Polling

Results

Libertarian nomination

Candidates

Declared 
 Roger Roots, nominee for Secretary of State of Montana in 2012

Independents

Candidates

Declined 
 John Bohlinger, former Lieutenant Governor of Montana (ran as a Democrat)
 Sam Rankin, real estate broker (did not qualify)

General election

Debates 
 Complete video of debate, October 20, 2014

Predictions

Polling 

With Adams

with Baucus

With Bohlinger

With Juneau

With Keenan

With Lindeen

With Schweitzer

With Walsh

Results

See also 
 2014 United States House of Representatives election in Montana
 2014 United States Senate elections
 2014 United States elections

References

External links 
 U.S. Senate elections in Montana, 2014 at Ballotpedia
 Campaign contributions at OpenSecrets

2014
Montana
2014 Montana elections